State Correctional Institution – Frackville is a maximum-security correctional facility for males off Interstate 81 in Ryan Township in rural Schuylkill County, Pennsylvania, on the outskirts of Frackville and about  northwest of Reading.

In 2017, the Pennsylvania Department of Corrections considered closing the prison, as part of an attempt by the state government to reduce the state's budget deficit. However, the prison was spared closure. Had SCI - Frackville closed it would likely have dealt a significant blow to the local economy, as it employs over 400 staff.

Construction and development of SCI-Frackville
Construction of SCI-Frackville cost $33 Million to construct and spurred development of motels and other businesses in the area.

Notable prisoners 
 George Feigley served part of his sentence at SCI-Frackville. He and his wife Sandra's website www.prisoners.com was highly critical of the prison.
 Anthony Peterson Jr. was to serve 11 years of the 14-year sentence for shooting Curtis Brinkley. According to Pennsylvania Department of Corrections, Peterson served his sentence at this facility.
 Stephen Hayes, serving life without the possibility of parole due to his involvement in the Cheshire, Connecticut home invasion murders

See also
 List of Pennsylvania state prisons

References

External links
 Penna. Department of Corrections - SCI Frackville

Prisons in Pennsylvania
Buildings and structures in Schuylkill County, Pennsylvania
1987 establishments in Pennsylvania